The 38th UIT World Shooting Championships was the contemporary name of the ISSF World Shooting Championships in all ISSF shooting events that were held in Cairo, Egypt in 1962.

Medal count

Rifle events

Men

Women

Pistol events

Men

Women

Shotgun events

Men

Women

Running target events

References

ISSF World Shooting Championships
ISSF
S
1962 in Egyptian sport
1960s in Cairo
Sports competitions in Cairo
Shooting competitions in Egypt